= Good Luck to Our Boys in Tan =

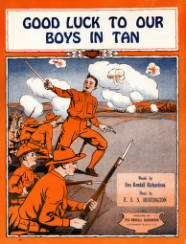

Song
- Published: 1919
- Songwriter: E.S.S. Huntington

Good Luck to Our Boys in Tan is a song written in 1919 by E.S.S. Huntington and published by Eva Rendall Richardson.
